The 2003–04 Moldovan National Division was the 13th season of top-tier football in Moldova.

Overview
It was contested by 8 teams and Sheriff Tiraspol won the championship.

League standings

Results

First and second round

Third and fourth round

Relegation/promotion play-off

Top goalscorers

References
Moldova - List of final tables (RSSSF)

Moldovan Super Liga seasons
1
Moldova